Aliabad (also Romanized as ‘Alīābād) is a village in Farim Rural District, Dodangeh District, Sari County, Mazandaran Province, Iran. As of the 2006 census, its population was 162, in 49 families.

References 

Populated places in Sari County